Memišević is a Bosnian surname that may refer to:

Damir Memišević (born 1984), Bosnian football player
Eldar Memišević (born 1992), Bosnian-born Qatari handball player
Refik Memišević (1956–2004), Yugoslav wrestler
Samir Memišević (born 1993), Bosnian football player
Zinaid Memišević (born 1950), Yugoslav theatre and film actor

Bosnian surnames